Nigel Fiegert (born 28 January 1976) is a former Australian rules footballer who played with Port Adelaide in the Australian Football League (AFL).

A defender, Fiegert was a foundation player for Port Adelaide, signed up as one of their zone selections in the 1996 AFL Draft. He missed selection for Port Adelaide's round one fixture but made his debut the following week in their first ever game at Football Park, against Essendon. Not selected for the next nine weeks, Fiegert kicked three goals on his return, playing as a forward against the Western Bulldogs. He played just two more games that year and the following year only appeared in the first half of the season. After playing in the opening five rounds of the 1999 AFL season, Fiegert wasn't picked again and was delisted at the end of the year. He was a fullback in Port Adelaide's SANFL premiership in 1999.

Fiegert won a Mail Medal in 2005, while playing for Lucindale in the Kowree-Naracoorte-Tatiara Football League.

References

1976 births
Australian rules footballers from South Australia
Port Adelaide Football Club players
Port Adelaide Magpies players
Port Adelaide Football Club (SANFL) players
Port Adelaide Football Club players (all competitions)
Living people